The Central Labor Union of New York, Brooklyn, and New Jersey was an early trade union organization that later broke up into various locals, which are now AFL–CIO members. The establishment of the CLU predates the consolidation of New York City (1897) by nearly two decades and is best known as the organization that created the American Labor Day holiday. Organized in 1867, it later spread to Philadelphia, Pennsylvania.  The union was firmly Marxist in orientation and was the first integrated labor union in the United States.

Politics
Closely linked to the Central Labor Union was the United Labor Party. Henry George was its candidate for Mayor of New York City in 1886 but lost the race by a wide margin.

See also
 Knights of Labor
 May Day
 Peter J. McGuire, 19th century labor leader
 Bolton Hall (activist), opposed War with Spain at Central Labor Union meeting

Defunct trade unions in the United States
Defunct American political movements
1867 establishments in the United States
1880s in the United States
Trade unions established in 1867